Bob Culbertson is an influential Chapman Stick player. An early adopter of the instrument, he is notable for his many recorded albums and extensive touring. 

Bob Culbertson has opened and performed with many popular musicians, including Robben Ford, Steve Morse, Allan Holdsworth, and members of Santana amongst many others. He has taught hundreds of players and released a set of instructional Stick videos titled Lessons on the Stick. His performances and seminars have been held around the world including U.S. Canada, Most of Europe, Australia, New Zealand, Japan, Indonesia, Mexico, and Central America.

Culbertson is famous not only for his technique, which allows him to play three to four parts simultaneously (e.g. bass line, chords and melody), but also for his compositional talent. His official discography lists 14 albums to his credit. Furthermore, a DVD of Bob Culbertson live (recorded in studio, in front of blue screen) is available. According to his official site, Bob Culbertson has sold over 200,000 albums, most of which sold during live concerts, seminars. He has garnered over 15,000,000 video views since 2015. Bob (content and concept) and Dan Chapman (photography and graphics) authored "The Chapman Stick Book" a full color book about the instruments, Emmett Chapman and worldwide influences.

Around 2002, Bob Culbertson together with Emmett Chapman and luthier Craig Anderson created the AcouStick, the first acoustical Stick instrument.  It is featured on Culbertson's CD AcouStick Dawn and DVD Un Viaje Classico.

Discography 
Most of Culbertson's albums are live, solo recordings with the use of no effects other than a small ambient use of reverb.  

Audio CDs:
 Bob Culbertson (19??) - solo, unlisted in official discography
 Stick (1989), unlisted in official discography
 New World Dance (1992) - African Rain, unlisted in official discography
 A Moment In Time (1994) - solo
 Season of Joy (1995) - solo
 Cafe San Francisco (1996) - solo
 The Touch (1998) - solo
 Romantica I (2000) - solo
 Romantica II (2000) - solo
 AcouStick Dawn (2003) - solo
 Celtic Waters (2012) with flute and Cello
 Beatles On the Stick (2014) -solo
 Colors (2015) -solo
 Cause And Affect (2015) duo with Drummer Rick Alegria

VHS:
 Solo Flight (1999)

DVD:
 Un Viaje Classico (2003)

Instructional video:
 Lessons on the Stick (1999)
 Lessons on the Stick (DVD) (2008)

BOOKS
 The Touch System (1979)
 The Chapman Stick Book (2015)
Compilations:
 Tappistry, Vol. 1 (1996) — 1 track
 Stick Night '99 (1999) — 2 tracks

References

External links 
Official Bob Culbertson Site
Interview with Bob
The AcouStick
Official Stick Source

Chapman Stick players
Living people
Place of birth missing (living people)
Year of birth missing (living people)